Yvetta Blanarovičová (born 24 September 1963) is a Slovak actress and singer. At the 1994 Thalia Awards she won the category of Best Actress in an Opera, Opereta or Musical, for her performance in the musical My Fair Lady.

Selected filmography 
The Night of the Emerald Moon (1985)
Princess Jasnenka and the Flying Shoemaker (1987)
Vrať se do hrobu! (1990)
Golet v údolí (1995)

References

External links

1963 births
Living people
21st-century Slovak women singers
Slovak film actresses
Slovak stage actresses
Slovak television actresses
People from Bojnice
Czechoslovak actresses
20th-century Slovak actresses
21st-century Slovak actresses
20th-century Slovak women singers
Czechoslovak women singers
Recipients of the Thalia Award